Jack Hillier may refer to

 Jack Hillier (art historian) (1912–1995)
 Jack Hillier (footballer)